Bertolacci is an Italian surname. Notable people with the surname include:

A. Bertolacci (1776-1833), Auditor General of Sri Lanka
Andrea Bertolacci (born 1991), Italian footballer
Lauren Bertolacci (born 1985), Australian volleyball player

Italian-language surnames